The 2016 World Series was the championship series of Major League Baseball's (MLB) 2016 season. The 112th edition of the World Series, it was a best-of-seven playoff between the National League (NL) champion Chicago Cubs and the American League (AL) champion Cleveland Indians, the first meeting of those franchises in postseason history. The series was played between October 25 and November 2 (although Game 7 ended slightly after 12:00 am local time on November 3). The Indians had home-field advantage because the AL had won the 2016 All-Star Game. This was the final World Series to have home-field advantage determined by the All-Star Game results; since , home-field advantage has been awarded to the team with the better record. Many consider the 2016 World Series to be one of the best of all time, due to the underdog story behind both teams, the games being tightly contested, and the series going the full distance.

The Cubs defeated the Indians 4–3 to capture their first World Series championship since 1908, and their first while playing at Wrigley Field. The deciding seventh game, won by Chicago 8–7 in ten innings, was the fifth World Series Game 7 to go into extra innings, and the first since 1997 (which, coincidentally, the Indians also lost). It was also the first Game 7 to have a rain delay, which occurred as the 10th inning was about to start. The Cubs became the sixth team to come back from a 3–1 deficit to win a best-of-seven World Series. 

The Cubs, playing in their 11th World Series overall and their first since 1945, won their third championship and first since 1908, ending the longest world championship drought in North American professional sports history. It was the Indians' sixth appearance in the World Series and their first since 1997, with their last Series win having come in 1948. Cleveland manager Terry Francona, who had previously won World Series titles with the Boston Red Sox in 2004 and 2007, fell short in his bid to become the third manager to win his first three trips to the Fall Classic, after Casey Stengel and Joe Torre.

The 2016 World Series was highly anticipated; the two teams entered their matchup as the two franchises with the longest World Series title droughts, a combined 176  seasons without a championship. At the series' conclusion, numerous outlets listed Game 7 as an instant classic, and the entire Series as one of the greatest of all time.

Background

Chicago Cubs

The Cubs qualified for the postseason by winning the National League Central, ending the regular season with the best record in all of MLB (103–58) for the first time since 1945; they also posted their highest winning percentage since 1935, and won their most games since 1910. The division title was their sixth since division play began in 1969, and their first since 2008. The Cubs entered the postseason as the #1 seed in the National League, and they defeated the 5th-seeded San Francisco Giants 3–1 of the NL Division Series before clinching their first NL pennant since 1945 with a 4–2 series win over the 3rd-seeded Los Angeles Dodgers in the NL Championship Series.

This made him the eighth person to manage pennant winning teams in both leagues.

Cleveland Indians

The Indians made their sixth appearance in the World Series.

The Indians qualified for the postseason by winning the American League Central, their eighth division title and their first since 2007. The Indians were the #2 seed in the American League, and they defeated the 3rd-seeded Boston Red Sox 3–0 in the AL Division Series before clinching the pennant with a 4–1 victory over the 4th-seeded Toronto Blue Jays in the AL Championship Series.

For Indians manager Terry Francona, it was his third appearance in the World Series.  He won his previous two appearances – 2004 and 2007 – as manager of the Boston Red Sox, in sweeps of the St. Louis Cardinals and the Colorado Rockies.

This was the third postseason meeting between Francona and Maddon. Maddon's Rays defeated Francona's Red Sox in the 2008 American League Championship Series, while Maddon's Rays defeated Francona's Indians in the 2013 American League Wild Card Game.

Summary

Game summaries

Game 1

Former Indians and Cubs player Kenny Lofton threw the ceremonial first pitch before Game 1 while Rachel Platten sang the national anthem. Corey Kluber started for the Indians, and Jon Lester started for the Cubs. Kyle Schwarber, who had missed nearly all of the 2016 season after tearing ligaments in his left leg in the season's third game, was added to the Cubs' World Series roster and started as their designated hitter. Schwarber struck out twice, but also doubled and drew a walk. The double made Schwarber the first non-pitcher to get his first hit of the season in the World Series.

Kluber made World Series history by striking out eight hitters in the first three innings. Roberto Pérez became the first ever ninth-place hitter with two homers in a World Series game, the first Indians player to hit two homers in a Series game, and the first Puerto Rican-born player to hit two homers in a World Series game. In the first, the Indians loaded the bases off Lester on a single and two walks before José Ramirez's single drove in a run, then Lester hit Brandon Guyer with a pitch to force in another. Perez's home run in the fourth made it 3–0 Indians. In the eighth, Justin Grimm walked Guyer with two outs and allowed a single to Lonnie Chisenhall, then Hector Rondon allowed Perez's second home run of the night. Andrew Miller and Cody Allen finished the victory for the Indians despite Miller having to pitch out of a bases-loaded jam in the seventh, and the Indians took Game 1 of the series 6–0. Francona's World Series winning streak reached nine with this victory.

Leading off the first inning, Dexter Fowler became the first African-American to play for the Cubs in a World Series.

Game 2

Former Indians player Carlos Baerga threw the ceremonial first pitch before Game 2 while LoCash performed the national anthem. The start time for the game was moved up an hour, because of the possibility of heavy rain in the forecast. Looking to tie the series at one game apiece, the Cubs sent Jake Arrieta to the mound against the Indians' Trevor Bauer who was still healing a lacerated pinkie resulting from an accident with a drone. The Cubs also featured six players under age 25 in the starting lineup, a postseason record. The Cubs started things off early as Kris Bryant singled in the first inning and Anthony Rizzo doubled to score Bryant and give the Cubs an early 1–0 lead. Arrieta started well too, retiring the first two batters before walking back-to-back batters in the bottom of the first. However, Arrieta got a flyout to end the inning. The Cubs struck again in the third following a two-out walk by Rizzo and a single by Ben Zobrist. A single by Kyle Schwarber scored Rizzo from second and pushed the Cubs' lead to 2–0. Bauer was forced from the game in the fourth, and the Cubs struck again in the fifth. Rizzo walked again off Zach McAllister, and Zobrist tripled to plate Rizzo. Another run-scoring single by Schwarber off Bryan Shaw and a bases-loaded walk by Addison Russell pushed the lead to 5–0.

Arrieta continued to pitch well, walking three batters but holding the Indians without a hit into the sixth inning. In the sixth, a double by Jason Kipnis ended the no-hitter, moved to third on a groundout and scored the lone Indians run of the game on a wild pitch by Arrieta. Arrieta allowed another single and was lifted for reliever Mike Montgomery. Both teams threatened in the seventh but could not score and, following a single by Mike Napoli in the bottom of the eighth, Aroldis Chapman entered to finish the game for the Cubs. The win marked the Cubs' first World Series game victory since 1945 and tied up the series at one game all. The game marked Indians manager Terry Francona's first loss in ten World Series games.

Game 3

For Game 3, former Cubs player Billy Williams threw the ceremonial first pitch before the start of the game, Fall Out Boy lead singer Patrick Stump sang the national anthem, and Bill Murray sang "Take Me Out to the Ball Game" during the seventh-inning stretch, to mark the Cubs' first World Series night game at home. Chicago pitcher Kyle Hendricks started against Cleveland pitcher Josh Tomlin.

The game's only run came off a Coco Crisp single that scored Michael Martínez from third in the seventh inning. Josh Tomlin, Andrew Miller, Bryan Shaw, and Cody Allen combined to shut out the Cubs. Allen earned his sixth postseason save as Javier Báez struck out swinging to end the game, leaving the tying and winning runs in scoring position. It was the fourth time in which the Cubs had lost in a shutout during the 2016 postseason.

Game 4

For Game 4, former Cubs pitchers Greg Maddux and Ferguson Jenkins threw the ceremonial first pitches before the start of the game while Cubs anthem singer John Vincent sang the national anthem, and actor Vince Vaughn sang "Take Me Out to the Ball Game" during the seventh-inning stretch.

The Cubs struck first when Dexter Fowler doubled to lead off the first and scored on Anthony Rizzo's one-out single, but Kluber held them to that one run through six innings before Francona turned it over to the bullpen. In the second, Carlos Santana's leadoff home run off Lackey tied the game; then, with two on, Kluber's RBI single put the Indians up 2–1. Kris Bryant committed two errors in that inning. Next inning, Jason Kipnis hit a leadoff double and scored on Francisco Lindor's single. In the sixth, Lonnie Chisenhall's sacrifice fly with two on off Mike Montgomery made it 4–1 Indians. Next inning, Justin Grimm allowed a leadoff double and one-out hit-by-pitch before being relieved by Travis Wood, who gave up a three-run home run to Kipnis put to the Indians ahead 7–1. The Cubs got one run back in the eighth, on a Dexter Fowler home run off Andrew Miller, which was the first run he gave up in the post-season. With the victory, the Indians were just one win away from their 1st World Series championship since 1948.

Game 5

For Game 5, former Cubs star and Hall of Fame member Ryne Sandberg threw the ceremonial first pitch before the start of the game, former Cubs public address announcer Wayne Messmer performed the national anthem, and Eddie Vedder sang "Take Me Out to the Ball Game" during the seventh-inning stretch. José Ramírez hit a home run for Cleveland in the second inning off Jon Lester, but the Cubs, facing elimination, scored three runs in the fourth inning off Trevor Bauer. Kris Bryant led off the inning with a home run. After Bryant's home run, Anthony Rizzo doubled and Ben Zobrist singled. Addison Russell's RBI single put the Cubs up 2–1. After Jason Heyward struck out, Javier Baez's bunt single moved Zobrist to third before David Ross's sacrifice fly made it 3–1 Cubs. The Indians cut their deficit to 3–2 off Lester in the sixth on Francisco Lindor's RBI single that scored Rajai Davis from second base. With the tying run on second base in the seventh inning, Maddon brought in Aroldis Chapman, who threw  scoreless innings, earning his first save of the series and fourth overall in the postseason.

Game 6

The last living member of Cleveland's 1948 World Series championship team, Eddie Robinson, attended Game 6 at Progressive Field. Former Indians pitcher Dennis Martínez threw out the ceremonial first pitch before the game while country singer Hunter Hayes sang the national anthem.

The Cubs scored three runs in the first inning, all with two outs, on a Kris Bryant home run and a two-run double by Addison Russell after two singles off Josh Tomlin. In the third inning, the Cubs loaded the bases on a walk and two singles off Tomlin, who was relieved by Dan Otero. Following the pitching change, Russell hit the 19th grand slam in World Series history to extend the Cubs lead to 7–0. In the bottom of the fourth, Mike Napoli drove in Jason Kipnis, who doubled to lead off, with an RBI single to cut the deficit to 7–1. In the bottom of the fifth, Kipnis drove a ball over the left field wall for a home run to make it a 7–2 game. In the top of the ninth with a runner on and two outs, Anthony Rizzo hit a two-run home run to right to make it 9–2. In the bottom of the inning, Aroldis Chapman allowed a leadoff walk to Brandon Guyer and was relieved by Pedro Strop, who threw a wild pitch to move Guyer to second and Roberto Perez's RBI single made it 9–3 Cubs with Perez thrown out at second for the second out. After Carlos Santana walked, Travis Wood relieved Strop and got Jason Kipnis to pop out to short to end the game and force a Game 7.

Russell's six RBIs tied a World Series single-game record.

Game 7

Game 7 of the series would go down as a classic, with some calling it the greatest Game 7 in World Series history, comparing it to 1924, 1960, 1991, 1997, and 2001 for its drama and tension. Former Indians player Jim Thome threw the ceremonial first pitch before the game while members of the Cleveland Orchestra string section performed the national anthem. The pitching matchup was between MLB earned run average (ERA) champion Kyle Hendricks, who had started Game 3 for the Cubs, and Corey Kluber, who had won games 1 and 4 and was pitching on three days' rest. Kluber came into the game 4–1 in the postseason with a 0.89 ERA.

Dexter Fowler led off the game with a home run for Chicago off Kluber, becoming the first player ever to hit a lead-off home run in a World Series Game 7. The Indians tied the game in the bottom of the third inning with an RBI single by Carlos Santana after Coco Crisp doubled and advanced to third on a Roberto Pérez sacrifice bunt. The Cubs scored two runs in the fourth inning with a sacrifice fly by Addison Russell (Kris Bryant running aggressively to tag up from third on the short fly ball and slide under the tag at home) and a double by Willson Contreras. To start the fifth inning, Javier Báez hit a home run to center making it 4–1 on the first pitch he saw to knock Kluber out of the game. ALCS MVP Andrew Miller came on in relief and gave up a walk to Bryant and RBI single to Anthony Rizzo to push the lead to 5–1 (Bryant's aggressiveness again instrumental as he was attempting to steal second on the hit, allowing him to score all the way from first). In the bottom of the fifth inning, Hendricks retired the first two batters. A two-out walk to Santana, which included a pitch that was called a ball and appeared to be a strike, persuaded Joe Maddon to relieve both his starter and the catcher. This move, along with others throughout the series, would be highly criticized afterward, as it appeared to some that Hendricks was pulled out too soon.

Jon Lester, who had started Games 1 and 5, came on in relief for the first time since the 2007 ALCS, coincidentally also against the Indians. David Ross (who usually caught for Lester and was playing in his final game) committed a throwing error that allowed Jason Kipnis to reach base and put runners on second and third. A wild pitch that ricocheted off Ross's helmet allowed Santana and Kipnis to score, narrowing the Cubs' lead to 5–3. To atone for his blunders, the 39-year-old Ross hit a home run to center, in his last official at-bat of his career, in the top of the sixth to make it a 6–3 game, becoming the oldest player to hit a home run in a World Series Game 7.

Lester retired the first two batters in the eighth inning, but was pulled after a José Ramírez single that Russell did not field cleanly at short. Maddon opted to use Aroldis Chapman, who had thrown 42 pitches in Game 5 and had also pitched in Game 6, despite the fact that the Cubs had already built a large lead. Brandon Guyer promptly hit a run-scoring double off Chapman, making the score 6–4. The next batter was Indians center fielder Rajai Davis, who had hit 55 career home runs in 11 seasons entering this game, and who was hitting .132 in the postseason up to that point. Davis hit a dramatic 2-run home run off Chapman, just barely clearing the left field wall and the left field foul pole, scoring Guyer and tying the game, making the score 6–6. Davis's home run was the latest-occurring game-tying home run in World Series Game 7 history. Many fans and Chapman himself believe he blew the lead due to his unnecessary use in Game 6.

The Cubs squandered a scoring chance in the top of the 9th. Ross led off with a walk and Jason Heyward grounded into a fielder's choice to take pinch runner Chris Coghlan off the bases.  Heyward stole second and advanced to third on a throw to second by Yan Gomes that got away from Kipnis. At this point Cleveland's Terry Francona made a defensive change in left, replacing Coco Crisp by inserting Michael Martinez in right and moving Guyer to left; this was eventually to backfire for the Indians. Javier Baez attempted a squeeze bunt with two strikes--another decision by Maddon which drew criticism--and fouled it off for the second out. Dexter Fowler would eventually ground out on a spectacular game-saving play by shortstop Francisco Lindor to end the top of the ninth. To the shock of many observers, Aroldis Chapman was asked by Maddon to return to the mound for the bottom of the ninth, but promptly retired the Indians in order, facing Carlos Santana, Jason Kipnis, and Francisco Lindor.

With the game tied 6–6 after nine innings, a sudden cloudburst resulted in a 17-minute rain delay. During the delay, Cubs right fielder Heyward called his teammates into a weight room behind Chicago's dugout and told them, "We're the best team in baseball... for a reason... Stick together and we're going to win this game." After the game, many of Heyward's teammates credited him with renewing their spirits.

When play resumed in the top of the tenth, Kyle Schwarber promptly led off with a single off of Indians pitcher Bryan Shaw. Here Maddon made a good move, replacing Schwarber with pinch-runner Albert Almora. Kris Bryant then hit a deep fly ball to center, and Almora tagged up and advanced to second base in what was called the "savviest baserunning play of the season." After an intentional walk to Anthony Rizzo, Ben Zobrist stepped up to the plate. Zobrist had been 0-for-4 in the game, but he delivered a clutch RBI double into the left field corner, scoring Almora and breaking the tie, making the score 7–6. Zobrist later said, "I was just battling, grinding up there. Fortunately, that last one he left over the plate and up to where I could just slap it down the line, and that was all I was trying to do."

After another intentional walk to Addison Russell, Miguel Montero, who had replaced Ross at catcher and was hitting just .091 in the postseason, delivered another clutch single onto left, scoring Rizzo and making the score 8–6. Trevor Bauer, the losing pitcher of Games 2 and 5, relieved Shaw and got out of the bases-loaded jam by striking out Heyward and retiring Baez on a flyout to escape further damage.

Carl Edwards Jr. was called on to finish off the Indians in the bottom of the tenth, but after retiring the first two hitters (Mike Napoli and José Ramírez), he walked Brandon Guyer, who took second base on defensive indifference. Rajai Davis, following up on his eighth-inning heroics, lined a single to center, making it a one-run game, and the score 8–7. Maddon then called on Mike Montgomery, who had zero career saves. Montgomery retired Michael Martinez (the replacement for Crisp who had scored the game-winning run in Game 3 but had struck out in his only two at-bats of the Series) with an infield grounder fielded by Bryant, who threw to Rizzo. This ended the game and the World Series, with the Cubs winning the series and ending their 108-year World Series championship drought. Zobrist was awarded the World Series MVP award after hitting .357 in the series and delivering the go-ahead hit.

After Game 7 
Rizzo called the rain delay "the most important thing to happen to the Chicago Cubs in the past 100 years. I don't think there's any way we win the game without it." Cubs president Theo Epstein said that when he heard about the meeting called by Heyward, "Right then I thought, 'We're winning this game.'"

The Cubs became the first team to come back from a 3–1 deficit to win the Series since the 1985 Kansas City Royals. They were also the first since the 1979 Pittsburgh Pirates to do so while winning Games 6 and 7 on the road, and the second team since the 1979 Pirates to win Game 7 as the visiting team, with the 2014 San Francisco Giants also having achieved that feat in Kansas City; almost one year later, the 2017 Houston Astros did the same thing in Los Angeles. With the Game 7 victory, Joe Maddon is 3–0 in postseason series against Terry Francona, having also won the 2008 ALCS and the 2013 Wild Card Game against him. Game 7 was the 60th extra inning game in World Series history, and the fifth time a Game 7 went into extra innings. This was the first extra inning Game 7 to be won by the visiting team, as the home team won the previous four times in 1912, 1924, 1991, and 1997.

With the Cubs winning, the Indians (who were renamed the Guardians in 2022) became the owners of MLB's longest active championship drought, which stood at 68 years, and currently stands at 74 years.

Game 7 of the 2016 World Series won the 2017 ESPY Award for Best Game.

Composite line score
2016 World Series (4–3): Chicago Cubs (NL) beat Cleveland Indians (AL).

Broadcasting

Television
Fox televised the series in the United States, under contract with Major League Baseball giving it exclusive rights to the World Series through 2021. Joe Buck was the network's play-by-play announcer, with John Smoltz as color commentator and Ken Rosenthal and Tom Verducci as field reporters. Fox Deportes also aired the Series and provided a Spanish-language simulcast over-the-air via Fox's SAP audio, with Carlos Álvarez and Duaner Sánchez announcing.

Sportsnet in English and RDS in French televised the series in Canada. Sportsnet used the MLB International feed produced by the MLB Network; Matt Vasgersian was MLB International's play-by-play announcer with the Toronto Blue Jays' play-by-play announcer Buck Martinez as their color analyst and MLB Network correspondent Lauren Shehadi and analyst Mark DeRosa as field reporters. Alain Usereau and former Montreal Expos player Marc Griffin handled the French-language telecast for RDS. BT Sport televised the series live in the United Kingdom and Ireland. WAPA-TV transmitted the series to Puerto Rico, with Rafael Bracero at the helm of the station's sports commentary of the series.

Ratings

Initial reports often utilize "fast national" ratings, which are subject to revision. Game 7 had over 40 million viewers, the largest audience for a baseball game since Game 7 of the 1991 World Series, while the series as a whole was the first to average double-digit ratings nationally since .

Radio

ESPN Radio's national network covered the World Series through affiliated stations, with Dan Shulman providing the play-by-play and Aaron Boone serving as color analyst. Tampa Bay Rays pitcher Chris Archer appeared as a guest analyst for select innings of Games 1 and 2.

Locally, the teams' flagship stations broadcast the series with their regular announcers. In Cleveland, WTAM (1100) and WMMS (100.7) carried the Indians' play-by-play with Tom Hamilton and Jim Rosenhaus, while in Chicago, WSCR (670) carried the Cubs' play-by-play with Pat Hughes, Ron Coomer, and Len Kasper. The affiliate stations of the teams' regional radio networks were contractually obligated to carry the national ESPN Radio feed; even so, since both WSCR and WTAM are clear-channel stations, most of the eastern and midwestern United States was able to hear the local broadcasts.

Celebration

Following the team's win in Game 7, Cubs fans congregated outside of Wrigley Field and the surrounding Wrigleyville neighborhood to celebrate the championship. On November 4, the team's victory parade began at Wrigley Field and headed down Lake Shore Drive and Michigan Avenue at downtown for a noon rally at Grant Park. Country singer Brett Eldredge sang a cover of "Go, Cubs, Go" during the rally. The city of Chicago estimated that over five million people attended the World Series parade and rally celebration, making it one of the largest gatherings in history, and according to some sources, the largest gathering in the history of the United States. After the season, the Cubs chose to make two traditional White House visits during then-President (and White Sox fan) Barack Obama's final week in office on January 16, 2017, and during President Donald Trump's tenure on June 28, 2017.

Aftermath

Cubs
The 2015–2020 Cubs had the greatest sustained run of success since the dead-ball era, but the Cubs’ teams after 2016 would fail to return to the World Series. The 2017 Cubs returned to the NLCS, but lost to the Los Angeles Dodgers in five games. In 2018, the Cubs finished tied with the Milwaukee Brewers for the division, but lost the tie-breaker game and were relegated to the 2018 NL Wild Card Game against the Colorado Rockies, which the Cubs would lose as well.

The Cubs' 2016 championship core slowly moved on via free agency, trade, or retirement. Dexter Fowler signed with the rival St. Louis Cardinals during the 2016–17 off-season. Aroldis Chapman returned to the New York Yankees by signing the largest contract ever for a relief pitcher. At the 2016 Winter Meetings, Jorge Soler and Travis Wood were traded to the Kansas City Royals for All-Star closer Wade Davis, effectively replacing Chapman. Game 7 was also the last game for fan favorite David Ross, who retired. After the 2019 season, Ross replaced Joe Maddon as Cubs manager. Maddon mutually parted ways with the club after five seasons in Chicago. Miguel Montero was  traded to the Toronto Blue Jays during the 2017 season. The 2017 season also turned out to be Jake Arrieta's last with the club; he signed a free agent contract with the Philadelphia Phillies (though he later returned to the Cubs in 2021). The 2017 season was also the last for John Lackey, who retired. Mike Montgomery, the man who recorded the final out in the 2016 World Series, was traded to Kansas City in 2019. After serious abuse allegation made against him by his ex-wife, Addison Russell's career came to an abrupt end after he was non-tendered by the Cubs following the 2019 season. World Series MVP Ben Zobrist retired after 2019 after familial problems as well. Theo Epstein announced that he would step down from his role with the Cubs as President of Baseball Operations effective November 20, 2020. A few weeks later, the Cubs non-tendered Kyle Schwarber and Albert Almora. Later in the off-season, Schwarber and Jon Lester signed one-year free agent contracts with the Washington Nationals, while Almora signed with the New York Mets.

By the 2021 trade deadline, the Cubs had fully committed to a re-build, as established players such as Anthony Rizzo, Kris Bryant, and Javier Baez were traded away for young players and prospects. Many fans and media drew a comparison with the 2016 Cubs to the 1986 New York Mets, as both teams had a young core when they won a World Series, both clubs had staged thrilling comebacks to win their respective World Series in seven games, and they both looked like a start to a potential dynasty; however, neither would return to another World Series.

After the departure of catcher Willson Contreras and outfielder Jason Heyward following the 2022 season, the only remaining player from the 2016 Cubs currently on the roster is pitcher Kyle Hendricks.

Indians

2016 was also the high point for the Indians. The 2017 Indians won 22 straight games – the second-longest winning streak in MLB history – on their way to a 102–60 record and AL Central title. However, they lost to the New York Yankees in five games in the ALDS after taking a 2–0 series lead. The Indians won their division again in 2018, but were swept by the Houston Astros in the ALDS.

During the 2020–21 off-season, the Indians had traded star shortstop Francisco Lindor, along with longtime rotation stalwart Carlos Carrasco, to the New York Mets.  Currently, the only 2016 Indian remaining on Cleveland's roster is José Ramírez.

See also

 List of World Series champions
 Curse of the Billy Goat
 Curse of Rocky Colavito
 2016 Japan Series
 2016 Korean Series

References

External links

2016
2016 Major League Baseball season
2016 World Series
2016 World Series
2010s in Chicago
2016 in Illinois
2016 in sports in Ohio
2010s in Cleveland
October 2016 sports events in the United States
November 2016 sports events in the United States
2016 World Series
2016 World Series
2016 in sports in Illinois